Cedar Canyon is a valley of the San Ysidro Mountains in San Diego County, California, extending from the northern slopes of Otay Mountain in the south to Otay Lakes Road in the north. Part of it is in the Otay Mountain Wilderness.

References

Canyons and gorges of California
Valleys of California